The Christmas discography of The Tabernacle Choir at Temple Square, a 360-member all-volunteer choir consists of at least six studio albums, at least eleven live albums, and many compilation albums.  The choir is part of the Church of Jesus Christ of Latter-day Saints.  However, the choir is completely self-funded, traveling and producing albums to support the organization.

The group's debut recording, Let The Mountains Shout For Joy/O My Father (1910) broke ground on the choir's long lasting influence on choral music.

The choir also performed "O Come All Ye Faithful" with crossover singer Josh Groban for his Grammy-nominated 2007 album, Noël, the best selling Holiday album of both 2007 and 2008.  The album went Sextuple Platinum in the United States. They likewise performed "The Lord's Prayer" with Andrea Bocelli for his 2009 best selling Holiday album, My Christmas which has sold in excess of 5 million copies world-wide.  The choir also performed "O Holy Night" with The Voice-winner Jordan Smith on his 2018 album, 'Tis The Season.

Discography

Studio albums

As featured artist

References

Christmas